Hayward station is a Bay Area Rapid Transit (BART) station in Hayward, California, serving Downtown Hayward and the surrounding areas. The station opened on September 11, 1972.

The elevated station has two side platforms. A two-lane bus terminal is located on the northeast side of the station. A pedestrian tunnel under the Union Pacific Railroad Oakland Subdivision connects the fare lobby to a parking lot and a five-level parking garage.

Bus connections 

Hayward station is a major bus hub for AC Transit, served by Transbay route M; local routes 10, 28, 34, 41, 56, 60, 83, 86, 93, 94, 95, and 99; and All Nighter route 801.

Shuttles to California State University, East Bay also serve the station. A small building near B Street is the Greyhound Lines intercity bus stop.

SamTrans Transbay buses served the station until mid-1999.

References

External links 

 BART - Hayward

Bay Area Rapid Transit stations in Alameda County, California
Stations on the Orange Line (BART)
Stations on the Green Line (BART)
Buildings and structures in Hayward, California
Transportation in Hayward, California